Lin Yu-fang (born 15 March 1951) is a Taiwanese politician. Lin was a Kuomintang legislator from 2008 to 2016 and the chairman of the Legislative Yuan's Diplomacy and National Defense Committee.

Education
Lin obtained his bachelor's and master's degrees in English literature and American Studies, respectively, from Tamkang University and doctoral degree in international politics from University of Virginia in the United States.

Political career
Lin was elected to the Legislative Yuan for the first time in 1995, via the Chinese New Party's party list. He represented Taipei 2, for two terms from 2002 to 2008, first for the People First Party, before switching to the Kuomintang. Lin then won two elections from the single-member Taipei 5 constituency, serving through 2016.

2008 legislative election

2016 legislative election

References

Living people
Kuomintang Members of the Legislative Yuan in Taiwan
Taiwanese politicians of Hakka descent
Politicians of the Republic of China on Taiwan from Kaohsiung
1951 births
Members of the 8th Legislative Yuan
Members of the 7th Legislative Yuan
Taipei Members of the Legislative Yuan
Members of the 3rd Legislative Yuan
Members of the 5th Legislative Yuan
Members of the 6th Legislative Yuan
New Party Members of the Legislative Yuan
People First Party Members of the Legislative Yuan